The 2022 St Helens Metropolitan Borough Council election is currently taking place as of 5 May 2022. Due to boundary changes, all 48 councillors will be elected at the same time, with the council moving to a system of all-out elections every four years. The election will take place alongside other local elections across the United Kingdom.

In the previous council election in 2021, Labour maintained its control of the council, holding 35 seats after the election. The Liberal Democrats where the Opposition with 4 Seats while the Greens, Conservatives and Rainhill Independents had 3 Each, Earlestown Independents had 1.

Background 

The Local Government Act 1972 created a two-tier system of metropolitan counties and districts covering Greater Manchester, Merseyside, South Yorkshire, Tyne and Wear, the West Midlands, and West Yorkshire starting in 1974. St Helens was a district of the Merseyside metropolitan county. The Local Government Act 1985 abolished the metropolitan counties, with metropolitan districts taking on most of their powers as metropolitan boroughs. The Liverpool City Region Combined Authority was created in 2014 and began electing the mayor of the Liverpool City Region from 2017. The body was given strategic powers covering a region that encompassed the former Merseyside metropolitan county with the addition of Halton Borough Council.

Since its formation, St Helens has continuously been under Labour control apart from a period of no overall control from 2004 to 2010. Labour continued to run the council from 2004 until the 2005 election, when the Liberal Democrats formed a coalition with the Conservatives in an arrangement that lasted until Labour regained control of the council in the 2010 election. In the most recent election in 2021, Labour lost three seats but maintained their majority. Of the seventeen seats up for election—sixteen on the normal thirds schedule and one by-election on the same date—Labour won twelve, independent candidates won two and the Liberal Democrats, Conservatives and Greens won one seat each.

St Helens council underwent boundary changes ahead of this election. The Local Government Boundary Commission for England determined that the council should continue to elect 48 councillors and designed new election boundaries to reflect population change. The new boundaries include thirteen three-member wards, four two-member wards and one single-member ward. The new boundaries will be used for all-out elections every four years instead of the previous model of election a third of councillors in each of three years out of four.

Electoral process 

The council previously elected its councillors in thirds, with a third being up for election every year for three years, with no election in the fourth year. However, following a boundary review, all forty-eight councillors will be elected at the same time. The election will take place by multi-member first-past-the-post voting, with each ward being represented by up to three councillors. Electors will be able to vote for as many candidates as there are seats to fill, and the candidates with the most votes in each ward will be elected.

All registered electors (British, Irish, Commonwealth and European Union citizens) living in St Helens aged 18 or over will be entitled to vote in the election. People who live at two addresses in different councils, such as university students with different term-time and holiday addresses, are entitled to be registered for and vote in elections in both local authorities. Voting in-person at polling stations will take place from 07:00 to 22:00 on election day, and voters will be able to apply for postal votes or proxy votes in advance of the election.

Ward results

Billinge and Seneley Green

Blackbrook

Bold and Lea Green

Eccleston

Haydock

Moss Bank

Newton-Le-Willows East

Newton-Le-Willows West

Parr

Peasley Cross and Fingerpost

Rainford

Rainhill

St Helens Town Centre

Sutton North West

Sutton South East

Thatto Heath

West Park

Windle

Previous council composition

References 

Council elections in the Metropolitan Borough of St Helens
Saint Helens